Lin Sen (16 March 1868 – 1 August 1943), courtesy name Tze-chao (子超), sobriquet Chang-jen (長仁), was a Chinese politician who served as Chairman of the National Government of the Republic of China from 1931 until his death.

Early life

Born to a middle-class family in Shanggan Township (尚幹鄉), Minhou County (閩侯縣), Fuzhou, Lin was educated by American missionaries.  He later worked in the Telegram Bureau of Taipei, Taiwan in 1884.  After the First Sino-Japanese War, he engaged in guerrilla activities against the Japanese occupiers. He returned to the mainland and worked in the Shanghai customs office in 1902. He later lived in Hawaii and San Francisco.

There he was recruited by the Tongmenghui in 1905, and was an overseas organizer for the Kuomintang.  During the Xinhai Revolution, he was in charge of the Jiangxi revolt. He became speaker of the senate in the National Assembly.  After the failed Second Revolution against President Yuan Shikai, Lin fled with Sun Yat-sen to Japan and joined his Chinese Revolutionary Party.  He was sent to the United States to raise funds from the party's local branches.  In 1917, he followed Sun to Guangzhou where he continued to lead its "extraordinary session" during the Constitutional Protection Movement.  When the assembly defected to the Beiyang government, he remained with Sun and later served as governor of Fujian.

Lin was a member of the right-wing Western Hills Group based in Shanghai.  The group was formed in Beijing shortly after Sun's death in 1925.  They called for a party congress to expel the Communists and to declare social revolution as incompatible with the KMT's national revolution.  The party pre-empted this faction and the ensuing congress expelled Western Hills' leaders and suspended the membership of the followers.  They supported Chiang Kai-shek's purge of the communists in 1927.  Lin rose to become the leader of the Western Hills faction and undertook a world tour after the demise of the Beiyang government.

As head of state
In 1931, Chairman Chiang's arrest of Hu Hanmin caused an uproar within the party and military.  Lin and other high-ranking officials called for the impeachment of Chiang.  The Japanese invasion of Manchuria prevented the civil war from erupting, however it did cause Chiang to resign on December 15.  Lin was appointed in his place as acting chairman and confirmed as chairman of government on January 1, 1932. He was chosen as a sign of personal respect and held few powers since the KMT wanted to avoid a repeat of Chiang's rule.  He never used the Presidential Palace, which Chiang continued to reside in, and preferred his modest rented house near the Sun Yat-sen Mausoleum.  Chiang's influence was virtually restored after the Battle of Shanghai (1932) as party grandees realized his necessity.

Shortly after acceding to the chairmanship, Lin Sen embarked on an extended trip that took him to the Philippines, Australia, the United States, the United Kingdom, Germany and France. He visited the Chinese diaspora and the Kuomintang party organisations in those countries. This was the first overseas visit by a serving head of state of China.

In 1934 TIME magazine called him "puppet President Lin", and when there was a talk by Military chief Chiang Kai-shek at a "Secret conference of government leaders" of granting the President of China actual powers, insinuating that Chiang was entertaining the thought of taking the Presidency himself, since Chiang held the actual power while Lin's position was described as "figurehead class".

Though he had little influence on public policy, Lin was highly respected by the public as an august elder statesman who was above politics.  His lack of political ambition, corruption, and nepotism was an exceedingly rare trait.  He lent dignity and stability to an office while other state institutions were in chaos.

A widower, Lin used his position to promote monogamy and combat concubinage which became a punishable felony in 1935.  He also called for a peaceful resolution when Chiang was kidnapped during the Xi'an Incident.  National unity was something he stressed as relations with Japan deteriorated further.

When the Second Sino-Japanese War entered full swing in 1937, he moved to the wartime capital of Chongqing.  He legalized civilian use of guerrilla warfare, but this was just a formality as it was already a widespread practice.  He spurned all offers to defect and collaborate with the Japanese puppet government.

Death
On 10 March 1943, his car was involved in an accident.  Two days later, he had a stroke while meeting the Canadian delegation.  As he was in hospice, he urged the recovery of Taiwan be included in the post-war settlement; it became part of the Cairo Declaration months later.  He died on August 1 at the age of 76 and a month of mourning was declared.  He was the longest serving head of state in the ROC while it still held mainland China.  The central executive committee elected Chiang as chairman of government a few hours after Lin's death.  All of the powers that were denied to the chairmanship were restored for Chiang.

Lin visited Qingzhi ("Green Plant") Mountain in Lianjiang, Fuzhou, Fujian and was fascinated by it, which encouraged him to style himself "Old Man Green Plant" (青芝老人 Qingzhi Laoren) in his old age. His monument, built beside Qingzhi Mountain in 1926 before his death, was damaged in the Cultural Revolution, and was restored in 1979.

Family

Lin had adopted his nephew Lin Jing (known in English as K.M. James Lin), as his son.  While studying as a postgraduate student in Ohio State University, James Lin married Viola Brown, a five-and-ten-cent store clerk, although he was reported already to have two wives in China. Lin Sen objected to the marriage and the couple eventually divorced. James Lin returned to China and died in action during the Japanese invasion.

Legacy

There are roads named after Lin Sen in Taipei, Kaohsiung, Tainan, and other towns and cities in Taiwan due to his role in fighting the Japanese invasion of Taiwan and as ROC president.

In the People's Republic of China, Lin was denounced for his anti-communism and roads and places named after Lin Sen were renamed, but he has since been rehabilitated after the Cultural Revolution.

See also
 Jieshou Park

References 

1868 births
1943 deaths
Chinese people of World War II
Presidents of the Republic of China
World War II political leaders
Politicians from Fuzhou
Members of the Kuomintang
Republic of China politicians from Fujian
Presidents of the Legislative Yuan
Tongmenghui members
Burials in Chongqing